China Girl is a 1987 independent neo-noir romantic thriller film directed by Abel Ferrara, and written by his longtime partner Nicholas St. John.

Story
China Girl is a contemporary take on the classic tale of Romeo and Juliet. Set in 1980s Manhattan, the plot revolves around the intimate relationship developing between Tony, a teenage boy from Little Italy, and Tye, a teenage girl from Chinatown, while both of their older brothers become engrossed in a heated gang war against each other. It also bears some similarities to the 1957 musical West Side Story, which similarly is an adaptation of Romeo and Juliet set among rival ethnic gangs in Manhattan, and also features a male protagonist named Tony.

Release
The film was released theatrically on September 25, 1987 in 193 theaters and grossed $531,362 its opening weekend. the film grossed a domestic total of $1,262,091 and its widest release was to 193 theaters. After its theatrical run, the film was released on videocassette by Vestron Video. Although a Region 2 DVD has been released, a Region 1 DVD has yet to be released, although it is currently available for digital download and streaming on Tubi in the United States.

Cast

Critical reception
The staff at Variety magazine said of the film, "China Girl is a masterfully directed, uncompromising drama and romance centering on gang rumbles (imaginary) between the neighboring Chinatown and Little Italy communities in New York City." and they especially praised the performances of Russell Wong and Joey Chin saying "Russell Wong (as handsome as a shirt ad model) and sidekick Joey Chin dominate their scenes as the young Chinese gang leaders."

Time Out magazine wrote that the film is a, "superior exploitation picture is a tough, stylish but often painfully misjudged reworking of Romeo and Juliet, with rival teenage gangs battling it out, sparked by the inter racial love affair between an Italian (Panebianco) and a Chinese girl (Chang), Ferrara makes excellent use of the Chinatown and Little Italy locations, and delivers the choreographed violence with his usual muscular panache." and that "The major strength of the script is its accommodation of three generations: the elders and their aspiring sons are seen to conspire against the warring youngsters, putting money before family."

Jonathan Rosenbaum of the Chicago Reader praised the film's photography and action scenes calling them "Bojan Bazelli's location photography is luminous and exciting, and the battle lines charted in Nicholas St. John's script are fairly complex."

References

External links
 
 
 

1987 films
1987 crime drama films
1987 independent films
1987 romantic drama films
1980s English-language films
American crime drama films
American independent films
American romantic drama films
Films about Chinese Americans
Films about interracial romance
Films based on Romeo and Juliet
Films directed by Abel Ferrara
Films produced by Michael Nozik
Films scored by Joe Delia
Modern adaptations of works by William Shakespeare
Vestron Pictures films
1980s American films
Films set in New York City
Films shot in New York City